San Martino Canavese is a comune (municipality) in the Metropolitan City of Turin in the Italian region Piedmont, located about  north of Turin.

San Martino Canavese borders the following municipalities: Castellamonte, Pavone Canavese, Colleretto Giacosa, Parella, Perosa Canavese, Torre Canavese, Scarmagno, Agliè, and Vialfrè.

References

Cities and towns in Piedmont